Jeevan Ram Shrestha( born 1965 December 30 ) is a Nepali politician, who served as the Minister of Culture, Tourism and Civil Aviation in the ruling coalition government led by Prime Minister and Nepali Congress President Sher Bahadur Deuba.

He is a member of the newly formed Communist Party of Nepal (Unified Socialist). His political engagement started from his college life as a student leader at Saraswoti Campus in Lainchaur.

Jeevan Ram Shrestha is the current elected president of Nepal Olympic Committee (NOC). He was an Ex-Secretary General of Nepal Olympic Committee. He has attended many events and actively made many plans on behalf of Nepal Olympic Committee. Jeevan Ram Shrestha is also the president of Nepal Ski Association.

Jeevan Ram Shrestha grew up in a middle-class family in Kathmandu.

Controversy

Arrest of a security guard 
In September 2022, the then Culture, Tourism and Civil Aviation minister Shrestha, faced public criticism after a security guard working at Chhaya Center in Thamel was arrested for asking Shrestha to remain in queue at a visa processing center. Shrestha had visited the visa center for biometric processing for his trip to Canada. According to the eyewitnesses, Shrestha felt humiliated and the heated exchanged soon ensued between the two. Soon after, Ministry of Culture, Tourism and Civil Aviation wrote to the Home Affairs stating that the security guard had misbehaved with the minister. Upon the direction of the Home Affairs, Nepal Police arrested the security guard, Sherjung Gurung and filed him for Indecent Behaviour under Clause 118 of the National Penal Code. The Kathmandu District Administration Office granted the police permission to keep Gurung in detention for five days for investigation. This sparked a outcry among the public as an abuse of power by Minister Shrestha surfaced in the media. Soon after, Gurung's wife filed a writ in the Supreme Court that her husband had been wrongfully arrested and demanded his immediate release. After the widespread criticism, Gurung was released from custody, two days after the incident.

References

1965 births
Living people
Communist Party of Nepal (Unified Socialist) politicians
Tribhuvan University alumni
Nepal MPs 2017–2022
Nepal Communist Party (NCP) politicians
Communist Party of Nepal (Unified Marxist–Leninist) politicians